Graham Webster may refer to:

 Graham Webster (archaeologist) (1913–2001), British archaeologist
 Graham Webster (footballer) (born 1992), Scottish football player